Ivan Šimko (born January 1, 1955, Bratislava) is Slovak politician and former defence minister.

A founding member of the Christian Democratic Movement (KDH) in 1990, Šimko left to co-found the Slovak Democratic and Christian Union in 2000. After a disagreement with Prime Minister Mikuláš Dzurinda, he led a group of MPs to form the Free Forum in January 2004. He surprisingly lost the party's leadership election two months later to Zuzana Martináková, and he left in October 2004 to form Mission 21 – New Christian Democracy.  In May 2010, he returned to the Christian Democratic Movement.

References 

1955 births
Living people
Politicians from Bratislava
Defence Ministers of Slovakia
Members of the National Council (Slovakia) 1994-1998
Members of the National Council (Slovakia) 1998-2002
Members of the National Council (Slovakia) 2002-2006